The AMIG HM 16 Hadid is an Iranian mortar. It  is manufactured by the Ammunition & Metallurgy Industries Group, part of Iran's Defense Industries Organization. It is a smoothbore and barrel-loading mortar with 360° field of firing and can be taken apart and carried by infantry.

Under the "Hadid" line, Iran also produces 60 mm and 81 mm mortars.

Users 

 Hamas
 Popular Mobilization Forces
  — HM 15, HM 16 and HM 19 seized from the Houthis by the United States and donated to Ukraine during the 2022 Russian invasion of Ukraine.

References 

Mortars of Iran
Islamic Republic of Iran Army
120mm mortars